Post-transplant survival measure is one-year survival after transplantation of the lungs. Factors used to predict it include FVC, ventilator use, age, creatinine, NYHA class and diagnosis. It is used for calculation of transplant benefit by subtracting another variable called waitlist urgency measure from it. The final lung allocation score, which is meant to reflect the overall transplant benefit, incorporates this element as well.

References 

Organ transplantation